The  Odendisa Runestone, sometimes called the Hassmyra Runestone, is a Viking Age runestone erected at Hassmyra, Västmanland, Sweden.
It is exceptional in that it has a metric inscription, and in commemorating a woman.

The stone is first described in the 1660s. According to tradition, a farmer discovered the runestone while he plowed the field. A few years later it cracked into two part. It was mended in 1900 and raised anew at its present location.

Description

The inscription is read as:
buonti × kuþr × hulmkoetr × lit × resa × ufteʀ × oþintisu × kunu × seno × kumbr × hifrya × til × hasuimura × iki betr × þon × byi raþr roþbalir × risti × runi × þisa × sikmuntaʀ × uaʀ ... sestʀ × kuþ

In regularised Old Norse:
Boandi goðr Holmgautr let ræisa æftiʀ Oðindisu, kunu sina. Kumbʀ hifrøya til Hasvimyra æigi bætri, þan byi raðr. Rauð-Balliʀ risti runiʀ þessaʀ. Sigmundaʀ vaʀ [Oðindisa] systiʀ goð.

English translation:
"The good husbandman Holmgautr had (the stone) raised in memory of Óðindísa, his wife. There will come to Hassmyra no better housewife, who arranges the estate. Red-Balli carved these runes. Óðindísa was a good sister to Sigmundr."

The runic text carved on the serpent of the Odendisa Runestone contains a poem in fornyrðislag and is one of few runestones raised for a woman, and the only one in Sweden with a verse commemorating a woman.

The metrical part is interpreted as:
Kumbʀ hifrøya /  til Hasvimyra / æigi bætri / þan byi raðr
"To Hassmyra will come no better housewife, who arranges the estate." 

The  housewife is thus remembered as the one "arranging the estate", as was usual in medieval Scandinavian society.

The theophoric name Odendisa (Old Norse: Óðindísa), which means "Lady of Odin," is a unique name and is not known from any other source. In addition, the name of her husband is very rare.

The Odendisa Runestone was carved by Red-Balli, a famous runemaster who was active in the region around lake Mälaren in the second half of the 11th century. 

The name Red-Balli is indicated by the runes roþbalir, which is not part of the main text carved on the serpent but starts a separate outer text band at the lower left of the inscription. 
This stone is classified as being carved in runestone style Pr4, also known as the Urnes style. This runestone style is characterized by slim and stylized animals that are interwoven into tight patterns. The animal heads are typically seen in profile with slender almond-shaped eyes and upwardly curled appendages on the noses and the necks.

See also
List of runestones

Notes

References
A Swedish site on the runestone.
A second Swedish site.
The entry for the stone at Skaldic Poetry of the Scandinavian Middle Ages.

Runestones in Västmanland
11th-century inscriptions
Runestones raised in memory of women
Old Norse poetry